Anderson Javier Machado [ma-CHA-do] (born January 25, 1981) is a professional baseball shortstop with Cariparma Parma in the Italian Baseball League.

Career
Machado was signed as a non-drafted free agent by the Philadelphia Phillies in 1998. He made his debut in American professional baseball in 1999 when he played for the Rookie League Gulf Coast League Phillies, Class A Piedmont Boll Weevils, and Class A-Advanced Clearwater Phillies. In 2000 and 2001, he played for both Clearwater and the Double-A Reading Phillies. All of his 2002 season and the majority of his 2003 season was spent in Reading. Machado made his Major League debut on September 27, 2003 for the Philadelphia Phillies.

Early in the 2004 season, he played for Clearwater and the Triple-A Scranton/Wilkes-Barre Red Barons. On July 30, Machado was traded with Josh Hancock to Cincinnati Reds for Brad Correll and Todd Jones. He played in 17 games for the Reds, but also played for the Triple-A Louisville Bats. The 24-year-old shortstop began 2005 on the 15-day disabled list following offseason surgery to repair a torn medial collateral ligament and torn meniscus in his left knee. He appeared in two games for the Reds in 2005, both as a pinch hitter, and was 0-for-2 at the plate; he also spent time in Louisville. Machado was claimed off waivers on July 20 by the Colorado Rockies. He played four games for the Rockies in addition to playing for the Triple-A Colorado Springs Sky Sox.

After becoming a free agent following his time with the Rockies organization, he was signed to a minor league contract with the Reds. He played in 2006 with the Double-A Chattanooga Lookouts, and 2007 with Triple-A Louisville. Machado wound up in the New York Mets system in 2008. During this time, he played with the Class A (Short Season) Brooklyn Cyclones, Double-A Binghamton Mets, and Triple-A New Orleans Zephyrs.

Machado began the 2009 season in the Pittsburgh Pirates minor league system. He saw playing time with the Double-A Altoona Curve and Triple-A Indianapolis Indians. On May 28, 2009, he was traded to the Chicago Cubs for future considerations. He played for their Triple-A Iowa Cubs. After being released by the Cubs, Machado played for the independent Atlantic League's Lancaster Barnstormers. In 2010, he was signed to a minor league contract with the Milwaukee Brewers and played for their Double-A Huntsville Stars.

See also
 List of Major League Baseball players from Venezuela

References

External links

Anderson Machado at Pura Pelota (Venezuelan Professional Baseball League)

1981 births
Living people
Águilas del Zulia players
Altoona Curve players
Binghamton Mets players
Bravos de Margarita players
Brooklyn Cyclones players
Chattanooga Lookouts players
Cincinnati Reds players
Clearwater Phillies players
Colorado Rockies players
Colorado Springs Sky Sox players
Florida Complex League Phillies players
Huntsville Stars players
Indianapolis Indians players
Iowa Cubs players
Lancaster Barnstormers players
Louisville Bats players
Major League Baseball players from Venezuela
Major League Baseball shortstops
Nashville Sounds players
New Orleans Zephyrs players
Parma Baseball Club players
Pastora de los Llanos players
Baseball players from Caracas
Philadelphia Phillies players
Piedmont Boll Weevils players
Reading Phillies players
Scranton/Wilkes-Barre Red Barons players
Tiburones de La Guaira players
Tigres de Aragua players
Venezuelan expatriate baseball players in the United States
Venezuelan expatriate baseball players in Italy